Kiley May (born 1986/1987) is a Mohawk and Cayuga storyteller, actor, screenwriter, filmmaker, and two-spirit activist in Toronto.

Life 
As a child, May lived at Six Nations of the Grand River, an Indian reserve in Ontario. She was assigned male at birth, but was feminine as a child. She experienced discrimination as a result of transphobia and homophobia.

In 2007, May left the reserve and moved to Toronto, where she attended journalism school at Ryerson University. While in school, she discovered a love for creative writing, but after graduating she didn't write for several years.

In 2017, May was the Youth Ambassador for Pride Toronto. She was additionally crowdfunding to pay for travel to Montreal for genital surgery.

In 2020, May was a winner of the Magee TV Diverse Screenwriters Award from the Toronto Screenwriting Conference.

Roles 

 Coroner, as River Baitz, ongoing
 It Chapter Two as Native American woman (from the fictitious “Shokopiwah” tribe)
 The D Cut

Notes

References

External links 

Living people
Year of birth missing (living people)
Date of birth missing (living people)
1980s births
Canadian Mohawk people
Cayuga people
Two-spirit people
21st-century Canadian screenwriters
21st-century Canadian actors
LGBT First Nations people
Canadian LGBT actors
Canadian non-binary actors
Non-binary writers
Non-binary activists
Transgender non-binary people
Transgender actresses
21st-century Canadian LGBT people